Sabin Marius Bornei (born January 5, 1975) is a retired amateur boxer from Romania, who won a bronze medal in the light flyweight division (– 48 kg) at the 1996 European Amateur Boxing Championships in Vejle, Denmark. Born in Bucharest, he represented his native country in the juniorflyweight class at the 1996 Summer Olympics in Atlanta, Georgia, where he was eliminated in the second round by Thailand's Somrot Kamsing.

External links
 Profile on sports-reference.com

References

1975 births
Living people

Flyweight boxers
Boxers at the 1996 Summer Olympics
Olympic boxers of Romania
Sportspeople from Bucharest
Romanian male boxers